South Korea and the International Monetary Fund (IMF) partner to assist the country in managing its financial system. Korea's economy is considered fundamentally sound because of the balance of their banking sector and their aim toward a zero structural balance without compromising their ability to sustain debt. The IMF Board in 2019 assessed that the policy framework and financial system in place are sturdy and firmly set.

History

IMF membership 
South Korea joined the IMF on  August 13, 1955. The relationship between the state and the institution have been steady for the most part. The country contributed $8.582 billion SDR (Special Drawing Rights) to the IMF quota, which comprises 1.81% of the IMF's funds. South Korea has 87,292 votes in the IMF, which is 1.73% of the total. South Korea's member of the IMF Board of Governor is Dong Yeon Kim and the alternate Board of Governor is Juyeol Lee. In 2019, the IMF and South Korea continued their partnership in support of capacity development. South Korea was willing to give $20 million of US dollars of support. This extension over the next 5 years should assist in technical assistance and training for low income states.

As of recent, the IMF sent a team to Seoul to discuss the fiscal policy that is supposed to assist growth in the short and medium term.

The Asian Financial Crisis

Intervention 
After the Korean War in 1953, the South Korean economy achieved sustained growth, but had accumulated an unseen amount of short term foreign debt. Korea was one of the last countries to be affected by the Asian Financial Crisis. The won dropped in value and a large investment panic in the state led to the eventual bankruptcies of chaebols that had borrowed huge amounts for their individual projects. In late November 1997, an IMF economist team was brought to Seoul to discuss a "bail out package" that was worth $60 billion and included several conditions that were to help restore the health of the country's economy. Other members of the World Bank and Asian Development Bank came to address the issues as well.  The bailout had conditions that forced Korea to go through restructuring policies and programs, such as new labor market policies that allowed more flexibility in terminating employees.

South Korea signed the agreement with the IMF to address their deficients due to the 1997 Asian financial crisis.

The structural provisions included:

 increased flexibility of exchange rates
 tightening of monetary policy
 structural reform to remove features of the economy that would stunt growth
 increased activity of foreign players in the domestic financial market 

Other policies and programs forced the Korea to slash government expenditure, raise interest rates, liberalize trade, restructure the government, and stop Korean conglomerates from expanding, in the hopes of stopping inflation and increasing foreign reserves. This action stabilized South Korea's foreign exchange market.

The policies impacted the South Korean population and families. By May 1998, 80% of households had suffered from lower incomes. Unemployment more than tripled from 2.05% in 1997 to 6.96% in 1999. South Koreans participated in a gold collecting campaign in the hopes of paying off the loans. Approximately one-quarter of the nation's population participated in the campaign from all  social classes, selling gold such as wedding bands and sports medals. $2.2 billion was raised from the gold campaign.

The residual costs from the loan conditions continue to affect the country These costs are reflected in cuts in funding for government programs, higher unemployment and slower economic growth. South Korea created a safety net with other Asian nations, to avoid any future financial crisis.

Financial Safety Net 

South Korea has not borrowed from the IMF since the 1997 crisis. According to the Organization for Economic Co-operation and Development (OECD), South Korea's reserves have increased from 21.556 billion SDR in 1997 to 247.759 billion SDR in 2014. As of 2017, the nation's foreign reserves are around $390 billion SDR.

As a result of the increasing complexity in world financial systems, South Korea joined the CMI (Chiang Mai Initiative materialization). The CMI is an agreement between Southeast Asian countries to use each country's respective foreign reserves to stabilize the region's economies in case of an emergency. The agreement helps to prevent financial contagion and is a safeguard against market panic. The agreement is not enforced and has never been used. Parties include South Korea, China, Hong Kong, Japan, Indonesia, Malaysia, Philippines, Singapore, Thailand, Vietnam, Cambodia, Myanmar, Brunei and Laos. The agreement allowed these nations to stop hoarding foreign reserves, which could theoretically help their economies grow, increase trust among foreign investors for local currencies more, and act as a safety net.

Today's Market

Labor Market Duality 
The labor market in South Korea is classified by the dual tier system. There are the "regular workers" and "non-regular workers". In the regular workers tier", the workers have higher wages and more social benefits. Alternatively, the "non-regular workers tier" receive significantly lower wages, more likely to have little to no social welfare and subordinate job security. This is due to the inconsistency of job lengths. A rapid increase in temporary work is an underlying fact that may potentially lead to problems in the long-term.

Based on statistics, the trends of "non-regular workers" has remained consistent and constant. From 1989 to 2016, the shares of temporary workers has fluctuated and hovered around 25-35%, but it overall remained steady. Factors that shift the balance of the two tiers is the large sums of women, children and the elderly. They take account for a majority of the unemployed, part-time and temporary workers.

Recent projections and outcomes 
South Korea's economy has experienced less short term growth in recent years. The GDP growth fell to 2.7 percent in 2018 relative to the 3.1 percent in the year prior. The predictions for 2019 is that growth will slightly fall to 2.6 percent due to an expected increase in internal demands and a decline in external demands.  Both foreign exports and investments weakened as a result of this diminishing growth, while the labor force productivity is on the decline. The target inflation is expected to be higher than the projected number for 2019 and 2020.

As of late, the Korean government is taking the proper steps to address this decline. In order to counter this decline, the government has increased their federal allowance and proposed a larger supplementary budget. In turn, this change is expected to boost the economic activity and provide fiscal support to the state.

References 

International Monetary Fund relations
IMF